The 2022 Torino Challenger was a professional tennis tournament played on hard courts. It was the first edition of the tournament which was part of the 2022 ATP Challenger Tour. It took place in Turin, Italy between 28 February and 6 March 2022.

Singles main draw entrants

Seeds

1 Rankings as of 21 February 2022.

Other entrants
The following players received wildcards into the singles main draw:
  Francesco Maestrelli
  Luca Potenza
  Matteo Viola

The following players received entry from the qualifying draw:
  Gijs Brouwer
  Antoine Escoffier
  Arthur Fils
  Michael Geerts
  Filip Jianu
  Ryan Peniston

The following player received entry as a lucky loser:
  Jonathan Eysseric

Champions

Singles

  Mats Moraing def.  Quentin Halys 7–6(13–11), 6–3.

Doubles

  Ruben Bemelmans /  Daniel Masur def.  Sander Arends /  David Pel 3–6, 6–3, [10–8].

References

Torino Challenger
February 2022 sports events in Italy
March 2022 sports events in Italy
2022 in Italian sport